Canopus Lake is a small lake within Clarence Fahnestock State Park in northern Putnam County, New York, United States. Immediately to its east is Pelton Pond. The lake is on NY 301 just west of the Taconic State Parkway.

The beach at the lake is used for  swimming, boating, and fishing.  In the winter, some cross-country skiers use the flat surface as a trail. The Appalachian Trail parallels the west side of the lake.

References

Lakes of New York (state)
Lakes of Putnam County, New York